Baden Powell (17 June 1931 – January 2014) was an English footballer who played as a right winger in the Football League for Darlington. He was on the books of Newcastle United, without playing for their league team, and also played for South Shields and Horden Colliery Welfare. He was born in Hebburn in 1931 and died in January 2014 at the age of 82.

References

1931 births
2014 deaths
People from Hebburn
Footballers from Tyne and Wear
English footballers
Association football wingers
Newcastle United F.C. players
South Shields F.C. (1936) players
Darlington F.C. players
Darlington Town F.C. players
English Football League players